Giraffe is the third full-length album by British musician Richard Warren, released under his pseudonym, Echoboy. It was released on February 10, 2003 on Mute Records in the United Kingdom and on February 25 of that year in the United States. It was produced by Flood.

Critical reception
Although Giraffe received generally favorable reviews from critics, not all reviews were favorable. Michael Idov of Pitchfork Media awarded the album a rating of 4.7 out of 10, describing the album as "50 minutes of structured wankery, as performed by a lone Brit with the questionable talent to put a chorus to a verse..."

Track listing
Automatic Eyes
Don't Destroy Me
Comfort of the Hum
Summer Rhythm
High Speed in Love
Fun in You
Lately Lonely
Good on T.V.
Wasted Spaces
Nearly All the Time

Personnel
Rob Bailey	Guitar (Electric)
Kevin Bales	Drums
Dark Moor	Mixing Assistant
Flood	Producer
Pauline Kirke	Cello
Rob Kirwan	Drum Programming, Engineer, Mixing
Liz Chi Yen Liew	Violin
Nilesh "Nilz" Patel	Mastering
Mick Rock	Photography
Paddy Taylor	Design
Jayne Williamson	Vocals

References

2003 albums
Mute Records albums
Albums produced by Flood (producer)
Richard Warren (musician) albums